Write & Wrong (also known as And She Was) is a 2007 Lifetime Television film directed by Graeme Clifford and starring Kirstie Alley and Eric Christian Olsen.

External links
 

Lifetime (TV network) films
2007 television films
2007 films
2007 comedy-drama films
Films directed by Graeme Clifford
American comedy-drama television films
Films shot in Vancouver
2000s English-language films
2000s American films